Peter Kildal (born 1 July 1975) is a Norwegian former bobsledder. He competed in the four man event at the 1998 Winter Olympics.

References

External links
 

1975 births
Living people
Norwegian male bobsledders
Olympic bobsledders of Norway
Bobsledders at the 1998 Winter Olympics
People from Akershus
Sportspeople from Viken (county)